Geobacter chapellei  is a Gram-negative, strictly anaerobic, mesophilic and non-motile bacterium from the genus of Geobacter which has been isolated fromaq uifer sediments from the Atlantic Coastal Plain in the United States.

See also 
 List of bacterial orders
 List of bacteria genera

References

 

Bacteria described in 2001
Thermodesulfobacteriota